Charles Fitzgerald  ( – 29 December 1887) was an Irish officer in the Royal Navy and Governor of The Gambia from 1844 until 1847, then Governor of Western Australia from 1848 to 1855.

Son of William FitzGerald, 2nd Duke of Leinster, Fitzgerald joined the Royal Navy in March 1809, passed his examination in 1815, and was commissioned in March 1826.

Soon after his arrival in Western Australia in 1848, Fitzgerald accompanied Augustus Gregory on an expedition in the Northampton region where Gregory and his brother had discovered lead the year before. An encounter with Aboriginal people resulted in Fitzgerald being speared in the leg and at least three Aborigines shot dead.

The town of Geraldton, Western Australia, was named after him.

References

Footnotes

Bibliography 
 
 

1791 births
1887 deaths
Colony of Western Australia people
Companions of the Order of the Bath
Governors of the Gambia
Governors of Western Australia
Royal Navy officers